The Broad Front (FA) is a Chilean political coalition founded in early 2017, composed of left-wing parties and movements. Its first electoral contest was the 2017 Chilean general election, where their presidential candidate Beatriz Sánchez came third with 20% of the vote in the first round of election (she just missed getting to the second-round run-off by 3%). The Broad Front also expanded their electoral representation to 20 deputies (out of 155), 1 senator (out of 43) and 21 out of 278 Regional Councillors, thus consolidating the movement as the 'third force' in Chilean politics.

Platform and ideology
The Broad Front's Declaration of Principles states five central aims as their reasons for political action:
 Promote an inclusive country, that respects the environment and safeguard social rights (such as education and healthcare).
 Move away from neoliberal economic policies and towards a socialist model of development.
 Create an alternative to challenge the center-left and center-right political coalitions that have ruled Chile since the end of the Pinochet regime.
 Promote the unity of diverse progressive forces and ensure their political independence from corporate power.
 Build a participative democracy.
Although it has the same name as the center-left coalition from Uruguay, political analysts tend to see the Broad Front as more similar to the Spanish left-wing populist party Podemos. Diverging views exist within the coalition. Some members, such as Liberal Vlado Mirosevic argued the coalition cannot be "broad" if it only includes left-leaning forces. On the other hand, presidential primary candidate Alberto Mayol highlighted the fact that a clear "leftist tradition" exists in most of the coalition members.

History

The Broad Front's origins lay in the 2011 Chilean student movement, the second biggest social protest in the country's recent history since the restoration of democracy in 1990. Student demands centered on the right to free education and led to months of school and university occupations across Chile, which continued for several years. Within the student movement, new political forces began to emerge, displacing traditional forces (such as the Communist Youth and center-left groups) at the head of high school and university unions and federations. Among them where Giorgio Jackson at the Catholic University and Gabriel Boric at the University of Chile.

In the 2014 Chilean general election, both Jackson and Boric became MPs after running as independents and defying both traditional coalitions: the center-right Chile Vamos and the center-left Nueva Mayoría (formerly, Concertación). Along with Vlado Mirosevic (Liberal Party), Jackson and Boric were currently the only Broad Front MPs at the moment of the alliance's constitution.

At early 2016, it was reported that Boric and Jackson held talks with several political and social movements in order to create a "broad left front" of anti-establishment forces, aiming to have a parliamentary list and a presidential candidate for the 2017 general elections. By August 2016, Boric's Autonomist Movement and Jackson's Democratic Revolution made a formal alliance with the Libertarian Left, New Democracy and the Humanist Party. After the October 2016 municipal elections, Jorge Sharp (from the Autonomist Movement) became the first political independent to rule Chile's third largest city: Valparaiso. Sharp's rise began as a grassroots initiative, running with several other left-wing candidates in a "citizen primary", described by The Guardian as a "quiet revolution against politics-as-usual".

In January 2017 the Broad Front was formally established by eleven political forces. Discussions began on how to choose a presidential nominee. Initially, the coalition was in favor of implementing an online referendum, but later decided in favor of participating in the legal primary process, since this would give them the chance to engage in a real electoral test and obtain national coverage at the same level as their well-established rival political coalitions. Since most of the Broad Front forces were movements lacking official status as political parties, the bloc decided to collect thousands of signatures to grant Democratic Revolution official political party status and use it to apply for the primaries. In May 2017, Democratic Revolution submitted close to 49 thousand signatures to the Electoral Service, thus qualifying for implementing primaries.

In June 2017, Constanza Valdés became the spokesperson for the Broad Front. She was the first trans spokesperson for a political organization.

The primaries took place as part of the July 2017 Chilean presidential primaries. Beatriz Sanchez, a popular journalist nominated by the majority of the Broad Front forces, obtained 67.56%, beating sociologist Alberto Mayol, who obtained 32.44%. 327,716 people voted in the Broad Front primary (a small number compared to the 1,418,138 who decided to vote for the right-wing Chile Vamos candidates).

As of September 2017 — and according to several opinion polls — Beatriz Sanchez was fighting closely with Nueva Mayoría candidate, Alejandro Guillier, to make it into the second round of and face businessman and former president Sebastián Piñera.

The Broad Front presented several candidates for the Chamber of Deputies and Regional Councils, as well as some for the Senate. Among the notable figures were (besides those currently serving as MPs at that time) former presidential candidate Tomás Hirsch, journalist Pamela Jiles, student leaders such as former FECh president Camila Rojas and several others.

Finally, in the November general election, Sánchez came third with 20% of the vote — just missing getting into the second-round by 3%. This was the best performance of any non-traditional left-wing candidate since the return to democracy. The Broad Front also expanded their electoral representation from 3 to 20 deputies, one senator and 21 Regional Counselors, thus consolidating the alliances as the "third force" of Chilean politics.

Composition
The coalition consists of five (5) political parties and movements:

References

External links
Official website

2017 establishments in Chile
Democratic socialism
Left-wing political party alliances
Political organizations established in 2017
Political party alliances in Chile
Progressivism